Winfall Historic District is a national historic district located at Winfall, near Hertford, Perquimans County, North Carolina.  The district encompasses 72 contributing buildings and 1 contributing structure in the town of Winfall. The district developed between about 1860 and 1950, and includes notable examples of Queen Anne and Bungalow / American Craftsman style architecture. Notable buildings include the Epworth United Methodist Church, W.E. Speight House (c. 1888), the J.D. White House (c. 1890), the Alonzo R. Winslow House (c. 1894), the R.T. White House (1895), and the Jesse H. Baker House (c. 1920).

The house was added to the National Register of Historic Places in 2003.

References

Historic districts on the National Register of Historic Places in North Carolina
Queen Anne architecture in North Carolina
Buildings and structures in Perquimans County, North Carolina
National Register of Historic Places in Perquimans County, North Carolina